Richard Ollie Crane (June 6, 1918 – March 9, 1969) was a character actor whose career spanned three decades in films and television. His early career included many uncredited performances in feature films made in the 1940s.

Early years and career
Crane was born in New Castle, Indiana. Crane may be best remembered for his portrayal of the title role in the TV science fiction series Rocky Jones, Space Ranger, which ran for two seasons starting in 1954. In 1952, he signed a seven-year contract that specified he was to make annual tours of the United States, appearing as Jones in presentations to school groups.

In 1949–1950, he portrayed Lieutenant Cummings in Mysteries of Chinatown a crime drama on ABC television. Crane also appeared in the outer-space adventure serial Commando Cody: Sky Marshal of the Universe in 1953, as Dick Preston, Cody's semi-comical sidekick, and was the hero of the 1951 serial based loosely on Jules Verne's Mysterious Island.

Crane portrayed Gene Plehan in the crime drama Surfside 6 on ABC (1960-1962). He later made numerous appearances in many popular TV shows. In 1958-1959 he made two guest appearances on Perry Mason: as George Moore in "The Case of the Lonely Heiress," and Dr. Douglas Keene in "The Case of the Caretaker's Cat."  Other television appearances included The Lone Ranger, Death Valley Days, Dragnet, Lassie, The Rifleman, and Gang Busters, in which he played gangster John Dillinger's associate Homer Van Meter. (Footage from Gang Busters, including Crane's part as Homer Van Meter, was edited into the low-budget theatrical film Guns Don't Argue.)

Crane acted on stage with the Las Palmas Theater, performing in Command Decision in 1949 and Light Up the Sky in 1950.

Death
Crane died of a heart attack at the age of 50. He is buried in Valhalla Memorial Park Cemetery.

Partial filmography

 Susan and God (1940) - Bob
 We Who Are Young (1940) - Savoy-Carlton Bellboy (uncredited)
 Meet the Wildcat (1940) - Bill—Office Worker (uncredited)
 Who Killed Aunt Maggie? (1940) - Radio Station Man (uncredited)
 Keeping Company (1940) - Eddie Lane (uncredited)
 The Saint in Palm Springs (1941) - Whitey (uncredited)
 Double Date (1941) - Boy (uncredited)
 In the Navy (1941) - Office Boy (uncredited)
 Keep 'Em Flying (1941) - Cadet Stevens (uncredited)
 Tillie the Toiler (1941) - Young man (uncredited)
 This Time for Keeps (1942) - Eustace Andrews
 Eagle Squadron (1942) - Griffith
 The Phantom Plainsmen (1942) - Tad Marvin
 Sweater Girl (1942) - Freshman (uncredited)
 Her Cardboard Lover (1942) - Casino Page (uncredited)
 Flying Tigers (1942) - Airfield Radioman (uncredited)
 This Is the Army (1943) - Sergeant on Field March (uncredited)
 Someone to Remember (1943) - Paul Parker
 So Proudly We Hail! (1943) - Georgie Larson (uncredited)
 Corvette K-225 (1943) - Leading Torpedo Man (uncredited)
 Happy Land (1943) - Russell 'Rusty' Marsh
 Cry 'Havoc' (1943) - Man (uncredited)
 Riders of the Deadline (1943) - Tim Mason
 Ladies Courageous (1944) - Carl (uncredited)
 None Shall Escape (1944) - Willie Grimm as a Man
 Follow the Boys (1944) - Marine Officer (uncredited)
 Wing and a Prayer (1944) - Ens. Gus Chisholm
 An American Romance (1944) - Hank (uncredited)
 Captain Eddie (1945) - Capt. Bill Cherry
 The Flying Serpent (1946) - Radio Announcer (uncredited)
 Behind Green Lights (1946) - Johnny Williams - Reporter
 Johnny Comes Flying Home (1946) - Johnny Martin
 Campus Honeymoon (1948) - Robert Watson
 Arthur Takes Over (1948) - James Clark
 Waterfront at Midnight (1948) - Denny Hanrohan
 Triple Threat (1948) - Don Whitney
 Angel on the Amazon (1948) - Johnny MacMahon
 Dynamite (1949) - Johnny Brown
 A Lady Without Passport (1950) - Lt. Maxon, Navy Flyer
 The Last Outpost (1951) - Lt. McReady (uncredited)
 Home Town Story (1951) - Don (uncredited)
 Mysterious Island (1951 serial) - Capt. Cyrus Harding
 Man in the Saddle (1951) - Juke Vird
 Leadville Gunslinger (1952) - Jim Blanchard
 Thundering Caravans (1952) - Deputy Dan Reed
 Ellis in Freedomland (1952) - Male Model
 Winning of the West (1953) - Jack Autry aka Jack Austin
 Woman They Almost Lynched (1953) - Yankee Lieutenant (uncredited)
 The Neanderthal Man (1953) - Dr. Ross Harkness
 The Great Adventures of Captain Kidd (1953 serial) - Richard Dale
 Sea of Lost Ships (1953) - Radar Man (uncredited)
 Flight Nurse (1953) - Lt. Will Cary (uncredited)
 The Eternal Sea (1955) - Lt. Johnson
 No Man's Woman (1955) - Dick Sawyer
 Bobby Ware Is Missing (1955) - Police Car Deputy in Car #12
 The Eddy Duchin Story (1956) - Seaman (uncredited)
 Bailout at 43,000 (1957) - Captain Jack Nolan
 Official Detective (1957, Episode: "Hired Killer") - Det. Benson
 The Deep Six (1958) - Lieutenant j.g. Swanson
 The Alligator People (1959) - Paul Webster
 Battle Flame (1959) - Dr. Bill Stoddard
 13 Fighting Men (1960) - Loomis
 Devil's Partner (1961) - David Simpson
 Boy Who Caught a Crook (1961) - Connors
 House of the Damned (1963) - Joseph Schiller
 Please Don't Touch Me (1963)
 Surf Party (1964) - Sgt. Wayne Neal

References

Sources and External Links

 

Profile, epguides.com
Space Hero Files: Rocky Jones, Space Ranger, slick-net.com
A database and Cover gallery of Rocky Jones, Space Ranger, comics.org

1918 births
1969 deaths
People from New Castle, Indiana
American male film actors
Male film serial actors
American male television actors
Male actors from Indiana
Burials at Valhalla Memorial Park Cemetery
20th-century American male actors